This is a list of string instruments.

Bowed 

 Agiarut (Alaska)
 Ainu fiddle (Ainu)
 Ajaeng (Korea)
 Alexander violin (United States)
 Anzad
 Apache fiddle (Apache)
 Apkhyarta (Abkhazia)
 Arpeggione
 Banhu (China)
 Baryton
 Bazantar (United States)
 Bowed dulcimer
 Bowed guitar
 Bowed psaltery (United States)
 Byzaanchy (Tuva)
 Byzantine lyra (Greece)
 Calabrian Lira (Italy)
 Cello
Electric cello
Cello da spalla
 Chagane (Azerbaijan)
 Chikara (India)
 Chiwang (Bhutan)
 Chrotta (Wales)
 Chuniri (Georgia)
 Cimboa (cape verde)
 Cizhonghu (China)
 Cornstalk fiddle
 Cretan lyra (Greece)
 Crwth (Wales)
 Daguangxian
 Dahu (China)
 Đàn gáo (Vietnam)
 Đàn hô  (Vietnam)
 Đàn nhi (Vietnam)
 Datong
 Daxophone
 Dhantara (India)
 Dihu (China)
 Diyingehu (China)
 Donskory Ryley (Russia)
 Double bass
 Electric double bass
 Drejelire
 Ducheke (amur)
 Dūda (latvia)
 Endingidi (Uganda)
 Enneg (Mexico)
 Erhu (China)
 Erxian (China)
 Esraj (India)
 Fiddle
 Fiðla (Icelandic)
 Gadulka (Bulgaria)
 Gaohu (China)
 Gehu (China)
 Ghaychak (Iran)
 Ģīga (Latvia)
 Giga (Norway)
 Goje (Mali)
 Gudok (Russia)
 Gue (Shetland)
 Gunjac (Croatia)
 Gusle (bulkans)
 Haegeum (Korea)
 Hardanger fiddle (Norway)
 Huluhu (China)
 Huqin (China)
 Hurdy gurdy (Italy Spain and France)
 Huqin (China)
 Igil (Tuva)
 Imzad (Africa)
 Jap fiddle (Japan)
 Jiaohu (China)
 Jing erhu (China)
 Jinghu (China)
 Jouhikko (Finland)
 Kaisatsuko
 Kamancheh (Iran)
 Kemenche (Turkey)
 Kemence (Balkans)
Classical Kemençe
Kemençe of the Black Sea 
 Kezaixian
 Kingri (India)
 Kobyz (Kazakhstan)
 Kokyū (Japan)
 Kongahyan (Java)
 Kontra
 Krem (Jah hut)
 K'ni (Vietnam)
 Langspil (Iceland)
 Låtflol (Sweden)
 Leiqin (China)
 Lijerica (Croatia)
 Lira (Ukraine)
 Lira da braccio
 Lirone
 Liujiaoxian
 Lokanga bara (Madagascar)
 Macedonian lyra
 Maguhu (China)
 Masenqo (Ethiopia)
 Moraharpa (Sweden)
 Morin khuur (Mongolia)
 Musical saw
 Nail violin
 Neola (Wales)
 Ninera
 Niutuiqin
 Nyckelharpa (Sweden)
 N'vike
 Octobass
 Organistrum
 Orutu (East Africa)
 Pena
 Philomel (Italy France and German)
 Phonofiddle
 Pinaka vina (India)
 Psalmodikon
 Psaltry
 Qelutviaq
 Rabeca
 Rabel
 Ravanahatha (India)
 Rebab   (Afghanistan, Pakistan and India)
 Rebec
 Salo
 Sanhu (China)
 Sarangi (India)
 Sarangi (Nepal)
 Sarinda (India)
 Saw bang
 Saw duang
 Saw sam sai (Thailand)
 Saw u
 Segankuru
 Sihu (China)
 Solangeum
 Soku
 Sorahi
 Streichmelodion
 Suroz
 Talharpa
 Tar shehnai
 Taus
 Tautirut
 Tenor violin
 Terz violin
 Tihu
 Tiqin
 Träskofiol
 Tro (Cambodia)
 Tro Khmer
 Trumpet marine or tromba marina
 Tuhu
 Ukelin
 Vielle
 Vielle à roue et à manche
 Viol (viola da gamba)
Lyra viol
Violone
Division viol
Pardessus de viole
Viola bastarda
 Viola
Electric viola
 Viola d'amore
 Viola organista
 Viola pomposa
 Violetta
 Violin
Baroque violin
Electric violin
Five-string violin
Kit violin (dancing master violin)
Pochette
Stroh violin
Violin octet
Vertical viola
 Violinzither
 Waterphone
 Wheelharp
 Xiqin
 Yakatat (Alaska)
 Yaylı tambur (Turkey)
 Yazheng (China)
 Yehu (China)
 Zhengni (China)
 Zhonghu (China)
 Zhuihu (China)

Plucked or strummed 

 Aarbajo (Nepal)
 Ahenk (Turkey)
 Ajayu (Chile)
 Angélique
 Appalachian dulcimer (United States)
 Archlute
 Asor (Hebrew)
 Auto-harp 
 Chromaharp
 Bağlama (Turkey)
 Bajo quinto and Bajo sexto (Mexico)
 Balalaika (Russia)
 Descant balalaika 
 Piccolo balalaika
 Prima balalaika
 Secunda balalaika
 Alto balalaika
 Tenor balalaika
 Bass balalaika
 Contrabass balalaika
 Bandol (Trinidad and Tobago)
 Bandolón (Mexico)
 Bandura (Ukraine)
 Bandurria (Spain)
 Banjo (United States)
 Banjo cello
 Banjolin
 [Banjulele]
 [Bass banjo]
 [Banjo|Bluegrass banjo (5-string banjo)]
 Contrabass banjo
 Electric banjo
 Fretless banjo
 Guitanjo 
 Long neck banjo
 Plectrum banjo
 Tenor banjo
 Barbat (Iran)
 Basolia (Ukraine and Poland)
 Bass guitar
 Electric bass guitar
 Acoustic bass guitar
 Begena (Ethiopia)
 Biwa (Japanese)
 Bordonua (Puerto Rico)
 Bouzouki (Greece)
 Trichorda
 Tetrachorda
 Brac
 Bugarija (Croatia)
 Buzuq (Lebanon)
 Cak
 Cavaquinho (Portugal and Brazil)
 Cekuntrung (Indonesia)
 Çeng (Turkey)
 Cetera
 ceterone (Italy)
 Chapey
 Charango (Bolivia)
Charango bajo
 Hulayacho
 Ronroco
 Charagón
 Chillador
 Hatun charango
 Ranka charango
 Chardha
 Chelys
 Chilili
 Chitarra battente (Italy)
 Chitarrone (Mexico)
 Chitrali sitar
 Chonguri
 Çifteli (Albania)
 Citole
 Cittern (Early Modern Britain)
 Ball Cittern
 Concheras
Mandolina conchera or concheras de mandolinas
Vihuela conchera or concheras de vihuelas
Guitarra conchera or concheras de guirarras
 Crwth
 Cuatro antiguo
 Cuatro cubano
 Cuatro (Puerto Rico and Venezuela)
 Venezuela Cuatro
 Puerto Rico cuatro
 Cuk
 Cümbüş (Turkey)
 Tamburo cümbüş
 Cura
 Cythara
 Đàn bầu (Vietnam)
 Đàn đáy
 Đàn nguyệt (Vietnam)
 Đàn tam (Vietnam)
 Đàn tính (Vietnam)
 Đàn tranh (Vietnam)
 Ðàn Tre (Vietnam)
 Đàn tú (Vietnam)
 Đàn tỳ bà (Vietnam)
 Diddley bow (United States)
 Dombra (Eastern Europe and Central Asia)
 Domra (Russia)
 Piccolo Domra
 Prims DomraPrima:
 Soprano DomraSoprano: b e1 a1[4]
 Alto DomraAlto: e a d1[5]
 Tenor DomraTenor: B e a[6]
 Bass DomraBass: E A d[7]
 Contrabass Domra (major)
 Contrabass Domra (minor)
 Doshpuluur (Tuva)
 Dotar
 Dotara (Bangladesh)
 Double bass
 Dramyin
 Dulcimer
 Duo'Lectar
 Dutar (Persia)
 Duxianqin (China)
 Ek Tare (Nepal)
 Ektara (India)
 Epinette des vosges
 Gabusi
 Gayageum (Korea)
 Geomungo (Korea)
 Geyerleier (Germany)
 Gittern
 Gottuvadhyam (India)
 Gravikord
 Gubguba
 Guitalin
 Guitar (Spain)
 Acoustic bass guitar
 Alto guitar
 Armónico
 Banjitar
 Baritone guitar
 Bass guitar
 Cigar box guitar
 Classical guitar
 Eight-string guitar
 Electric guitar
 Flamenco guitar
 Guitalele
 Harp guitar
 Nine-string guitar
 Octave guitar
 Dobro
 Seven-string guitar
 Tailed bridge guitar
 Tenor guitar
 Ten-string guitar
 Twelve-string guitar
 Guitaro
 Guitarrón argentino (Argentina)
 Guitarrón mexicano (Mexico)
 Guitarrón chileno (Chile)
 Guqin (China)
 Gusli (Russia)
 Guzheng (China)
 Harp
 Chromatic harp
 Electric harp
 Folk harp
 Pedal Harp (a.k.a. concert harp)
 Triple harp
 Harpsichord (Europe, keyboard instrument)
 Hu Hu (China)
 Huapanguera
 Huobosi
 Ichigenkin
 Idiochord (Latin)
 Inanga (Burundi)
 Janzi (Uganda)
 Jarana huasteca
 Jarana jarocha
 Jarana jarocha requinto
 Jarana Leona
 Kabosy
 Kacapi (Indonesia)
 Kanklės (Lithuania)
 Kannel (Estonia)
 Kantele (Finland)
 Kanun (Middle East, Persia, Greece)
 Karantouzemi (Greece)
 Khonkhota
 Koboz (Hungary)
 Kobza (Ukraine)
 Kokles (Latvia)
 Konghou (China)
 Kontigi (Nigeria)
 Komuz (Kyrgyzstan)
 Kora (West Africa)
 Koto (Japan)
 Krar (Eritrea)
 Kse diev (Cambodia)
 kumuz (Kyrgyzstan)
 Kutiyapi (Philippines)
 Kwitra (Algeria)
 Langeleik (Norway)
 Laouto (Greece)
 Laúd (Spain, Cuba)
Laúd, Philippines
 Lavta
 Liuqin (China)
 Liuto cantabile (Italy)
 Luc huyen cam (Vietnam)
 Lute (Europe)
 Harp lute
 Swedish lute
 Archlute
 Theorbo
 Lyra (Crete)
 Lyre (Greece)
 Mandolin (Italy)
 Electric mandolin
 Mandola ("tenor mandola", in the UK)
 Mandocello
 Mandolin-banjo
 Mandobass
 Octave mandolin ("Irish bouzouki")
 Piccolo mandolin
 Tremolo bass
 Mandore
 Mandolute
 Mandriola
 Mandotar
 Mejorana (Panama)
 Monochord
 Nevoud (Turkey)
 Ngombi
 Nigenkin (Japan)
 Nyatiti (Kenya)
 Octavina (Philippines)
 Octofone (United States)
 Oud (Middle East, Greece)
 Oungum
 Pandura
 Panduri
 Pararayki
 Pedal steel guitar (United States)
 Penorcon
 Phandar
 Pipa (China)
 Portuguese guitar (Portugal)
 Psaltery
 Qanun (Middle East, Persia, Greece)
 Qiftelia (Kosovo)
 Qinqin (China)
 Rawap
 Requinto
 Ronroco (Bolivia)
 Russian guitar
 Rubab
 Pamiri rubab
 Rudra veena (India)
 Ruan
 Sallaneh (Iran)
 Salterio (Mexico)
 Sambuca
 Sanshin (Okinawa, Japan)
 Sanxian (China)
 Sapeh
 Saraswati veena (India])
 Šargija (Albania)
 Sarod (India)
 Sasando (Indonesia)
 Saung (Burma)
 Saz (Turkey)
 Seni rebab
 Setar (Iran)
 Shamisen (Japan)
 Shashtar
 Sitar (India)
 Surbahar
 Socavon (Panama)
 Stoessel lute
 Strumstick (United States)
 Swarabat
 Tamboori
 Tambouras
 Tambura (Bulgaria)
 Tamburica
 Tanbur (Turkey)
 Tanpura (India)
 Tarhu
 Tarica (Europe)
 Tar (lute)
 tati
 Tea chest bass
 Tembor
 Tidinet
 Timple (Canary Islands)
 Tiple (North and South America)
 American tiple
 Tiple Colombiano
 Tiple Colombiano requinto
 Puerto Rican tiple
 Torban (Ukraine)
 Tovshuur (Mongolia)
 Tremoloa
 Hawaiian tremoloa
 Tres (Cuba)
 Cuban tres (Cuba)
 Puerto Rican Tres (Puerto Rico)
 Tricordia (Mexico)
 Tritantri vina
 Tungna
 Tzouras (Greece)
 Ukulele (Hawaii)
 Banjolele
 Baritone ukulele
 Bass ukulele
 Concert ukulele
 Taropatch (a.k.a. lili'u)
 Tahitian ukulele (Tahiti)
 Tenor ukulele
 Valiha (Madagascar)
 Veena (India)
 Mohan veena
 Ranjan veena
 Sagar veena
Triveni veena
 Vichitra veena (India)
 Vihuela (Mexico)
 Vihuela (Spain)
 Viola amarantina (Portugal)
 Viola beiroa (Portugal)
 Viola braguesa (Portugal)
 Viola caipira (Brazil)
 Viola campanica (Portugal])
 Viola da terra (the Azores)
 Viola de arame (Portugal)
 Viola de cocho (Brazil)
 Viola da Terceira (Azores)
 Viola toeira (Portugal)
 Walaycho (the Andes)
 Waldzither (Germany)
 Yaybahar
 Yueqin (China)
 Zheng (China)
 Zhongruan (China)
 Zhu (China)
 Zither
 Alpine zither (Central Europe)
 Concert zither (United States)
 Guitar zither

Struck or tapped 
 Berimbau (Brazil)
 Cimbalom (Hungary, Slovakia, Czech Republic, Romania)
 Chapman stick (United States)
 Chapman Stick
 Grand Stick
 Bass Stick
 Chitarra battente, a.k.a. "knocking guitar" (Italy)
 Clavichord (keyboard instrument)
 Clavinet (electric keyboard instrument)
 Đàn tam thập lục (Vietnam)
 Fiddlesticks
 Hammered dulcimer
 Harpejji
 Jhallari
 Khim (Thailand and Cambodia)
 Piano (Keyboard instrument)
 Santur/Santoor (Persia, India, Pakistan, Greece)
 Tsymbaly (Ukraine)
 Utogardon (Hungary)
 Warr guitar
 Yanggeum (Korea)
 Yangqin (China)

Other methods 
 Aeolian harp (air movement)
 Long String Instrument, (by Ellen Fullman, strings are rubbed in, and vibrate in the longitudinal mode)
 Magnetic resonance piano, (strings activated by electromagnetic fields)

Stringed instruments with keyboards

Struck
 Clavichord
 Clavinet
 Piano
 Fortepiano
 Pedal Piano
 Harmonichord
 Tangent piano
 Orphica

Plucked
 Clavicymbalum
 Harpsichord
 Archicembalo
 Lautenwerck
 Spinet
 Virginal
 Xenorphica

Bowed
 Nyckelharpa
 Hurdy-gurdy
 Viola organista
 Wheelharp

Other/hybrid
 Magnetic resonance piano

Stringed instruments by country

 Afghanistan (Rubab)
 Africa (regional):
 Hhajhuj (Sentir) (North Africa)
 Kibangala (Gabusi) (East Africa)
 Kora (West Africa)
 Kwitra (Kouitra)
 Loutar (Central North Africa)
 Nngoni (West and Central Africa)
 Oud arbi (Northern Africa)
 Ramkie (Southern Africa)
 Albania:
 Qiftelia
 Šargija
 Sharki (Sharkia)
 Algeria:
 Kwitra
 Mondol (Mandole)
 Argentina:
 Guitarrón Argentino
 Asia (regional):
 Dombra (Central Asia)
 Austria:
 Schrammel gitarre (Contraguitar)
 Xenorphica (Harp Piano)
 Zither (Alpine Zither)
 Azores:
 Viola da terceira
 Viola da terra
 Bangladesh:
 Dotara
 Gopichand
 Benelux:
 Hommel
 Vlier
 Épinette
 Hakkebord
 Bolivia:
 Charango
 Chillador
 Borneo:
 Kecapi dayak
 Sundatang
 Bosnia:
 Bugarija
 Šargija
 Saz (Bosnian saz)
 Brazil:
 Berimbau
 Cavaquinho
 Craviola
 Bahian guitar
 Viola caipira
 Viola de cocho
 Violão de sete cordas
 Bulgaria:
 Gadulka
 Tambura (Tamboura)
 Burma:
 Saung
 Migyaung
 Burundi:
 Inanga (Burundian zither)
 Cambodia:
 Chapey
 Khim
 Tro
 Canada:
 Mandolinetto
 Canary Islands:
 Timple
 Cape Verde:
 Viola de dez cordas
 Chile:
 Guitarrón Chileno
 China:
 Banhu
 Cizhonghu 
 Diyingehu 
 Dong pipa
 Erhu
 Erxian 
 Gaohu 
 Gehu 
 Guqin (Ku chin)
 Guzheng
 Huluhu
 Huqin (family of bowed lutes)
 Huobusi
 Jinghu 
 Laruan 
 Leiqin 
 Liuqin
 Maguhu 
 Nanyin pipa
 Pipa
 Qiqin
 Ruan
 Sanshin 
 Sanxian
 Sihu 
 Tianqin
 Yángqín (Chinese hammered dulcimer)
 Yazheng 
 Yehu
 Yueqin (Yueh qin; moon guitar)
 Zheng 
 Zhonghu 
 Zhongruan 
 Zhu
 Zhuihu
 Colombia:
 Bandola Andina Colombiana
 Tiple Colombiano
 Tiple Colombiano Requinto
 Comoros:
 Gabusi
 Congo:
 Karindula
 Lindanda
 Corsica:
 Cetera
 Crete:
 Lyra
 Croatia:
 Berda
 Bisernica
 Brac
 Bugarija
 Celo (Celovic)
 Gunjac
 Gusle
 Tambura samica (Dangubica)
 Tamburitza
 Cuba:
 Armónico
 Cuban cuatro
 Laúd cubano
 Tres cubano
 Ecuador
 Bandolin
 Eritrea:
Krar
 Estonia:
 Kannel
 Ethiopia:
 Masenqo
 Begena
 Europe (regional):
 Clavichord (Central Europe)
 Dombra (Eastern Europe)
 Guitar Zither(Central Europe)
 Harpsichord (Central Europe)
 Hurdy-gurdy (Western Europe)
 Lute
 Piano (Central & Southern Europe)
 Tamburitza (Central Europe)
 Tarica
 Finland:
 Jouhikko
 Kannel
 Kantele
 France:
 Epinette des Vosges
 Harp (Concert harp; Pedal harp)
 Hurdy-gurdy
 Gambia:
 Akonting
 Germany:
 Akkordolia
 Hackbrett
 Hammered dulcimer
 Scheitholt
 Waldzither
 Zither (Alpine zither)
 Ghana:
 Molo
 Great Britain
 Cittern
 Greece:
 Baglama
 Bouzouki
 Laghouto
 Laouto
 Lyre
 Oud
 Tabouras
 Tzouras (Tsoura; Jura)
 Hungary:
 Cimbalom
 Citera
 Kobza (Kobaz)
 Iceland:
 Langspil
 India:
 Bulbul tarang
 Ālāpiṇī vīṇā
 Ektara
 Esraj
 Gottuvadhyam veena (Gottu vadyam) (south India)
 Mahanataka veena
 Mohan veena
 Pinaka vina
 Ravanahatha
 Rudra veena
 Santoor
 Sarangi
 Saraswati veena(south India)
 Sarinda
 Sarod
 Seni rabab
 Sitar
 Surbahar (Bass sitar)
 Sursingar 
 Tanpura (Tampura)
 Tati (Nagaland)
 Tumbi (north India)
 Veena
 Vichitra veena
 Villu Paatu
 Indonesia (see also Borneo):
 Bijol
 Cak (Cuk; Keroncong guitar)
 Dambus
 Gambus selodang
 Hasapi
 Jungga
 Kacapi (Sundanese)(Java)
 Kecapi makassar (Sulawesi)
 Kulcapi karo
 Rebab (Java)
 Sasando
 Situr (Java, Bali)
 Iran (Persia):
 Barbat
 Chang (Harp)
 Dutar
 Ghaychak
 Kamancheh
 Mugni
 Qanun
 Rubab
 Rud
 Sallaneh
 Santur
 Sāz
 Setar
 Shahrud
 Shurangiz
 Sorahi
 Tanbur
 Tar
 Iraq:
 Qanún/kanun
 Santur/Santoor
 Ireland:
 Folk Harp (Celtic Harp)
 Irish bouzouki (Octave mandolin)
 Italy:
 Calabrian Lira (Calabria)
 Chitarra battente ("knocking guitar")
 Chitarrone
 Liuto cantabile (Naples)
 Mandolin (Mandolin family)
 Japan:
 Biwa
 Ichigenkin
 Gekkin
 Kokyū
 Koto
 Nigenkin
 Shamisen
 Sanshin
 Taishogoto
 Tonkori
 Kazakhstan:
 Kobyz
 Kenya:
 Nyatiti
 Korea:
 Ajaeng
 Dang bipa
 Gayageum
 Geomungo
 Haegeum
 Hyang bipa
 Komungo
 Yanggeum
 Kyrgyzstan:
 Kormuz
 Latvia:
 kokles
 Lebanon:
 Buzuq
 Lithuania:
 kanklės
 Macedonia:
 Tambura
 Madagascar:
 Kabosy
 Llokango voatavo
 Valiha
 Madeira:
 Braguinha (Machete de braga)
 Rajão
 Viola de arame (Viola da Madeira)
 Malaysia (see also Borneo):
 Gambus
 Gambus Melayu
 Sape
 Malawi:
 Bangwe
 Mali:
 Goje
 Malta:
 Terzin kitarra
 Mexico:
 Bajo quinto and Bajo sexto
 Cartonal
 Guitarra conchera
 Guitarra de golpe
 Guitarra de son (Requinto jarocho)
 Guitarra doble
 Guitarra séptima
 Guitarrón mexicano (Guitarrón)
 Huapanguera
 Jarana huasteca
 Jarana jarocha
 Mandolina conchera
 Requinto
 Salterio (Mexico)
 Tricordia
 Vihuela conchera
 Vihuela (Mexican vihuela)
 Mongolia:
 Morin khuur
 Naxi (Sugudu; Hubo; Huobusi)
 Sshanz (Shudraga)
 Tobshuur
 Topshur(Khomys)
 Morocco:
 Gunbri
 Gunibri
 Lotar
 Nepal:
 Sarangi
 Nigeria:
 Kontigi
 Norway:
 Hardingfele (Hardanger fiddle)
 Langeleik
 Panama:
 Mejoranera
 Socavon (Bocona)
 Peru:
 Bandurria
 Charango
 Philippines:
 Banduria
 Fegereng (Tiruray)
 Kitara
 Kudyapi
 Kudlung (Kudyapi; Fagelung)
 Kutiyapi (Maguindanao)
 Laud
 Octavina
 Portugal (see also Azores and Madeira):
 Bandolim
 Banjolim
 Cavaquinho
 Guitarra portuguesa (Portuguese guitar)
 Rajao
 Viola amarantina
 Violão baixa
 Viola beiroa
 Viola braguesa
 Viola campaniça
 Viola de arame
 Viola de fado
 Viola toeira
 Puerto Rico:
 Bordonúa
 Cuatro (Puerto Rican cuatro)
 Tiple (Puerto Rican tiple)
 Tres (Puerto Rican tres)
 Romania:
 Cobza
 Kontra
 Horn-violin
 Russia (see also Tuva):
 Balalaika
 Domra
 Guitar (Russian guitar)
 Gudok
 Gusli
 Rwanda:
 Inanga
 Sardinia:
 Kithera sarda
 Senegal:
 Akonting
 Serbia:
 Berda
 Bisernica
 Brac
 Bugarija
 Celo (Celovic)
 Tambura samica (Dangubica)
 Slovenia:
 Drone zither
 Spain:
 Bandurria
 Guitar (Spanish guitar)
 Guitar (Flamenco guitar)
 Guitarro (Guitarrico)
 Laúd
 Vihuela
 Sri Lanka:
 Ravanahatha
 Sweden:
 Hummel
 Nyckelharpa
 Tahiti:
 Tahitian ukulele
 Taiwan:
 Yueqin taiwan
 Tanzania:
 Zeze
 Thailand:
 Grajappi
 Jakhay
 Khim
 Phin
 Saw sam sai
 Sueng
 Sung lisu (Subu)
 Turkey:
 Bağlama 
 Çeng
 Cümbüş
 Kemenche
 Nevoud
 Saz
 Turkish tambur
 Yaylı tambur
 Tunisia:
 Gambara
 Gumbri
 Tuva:
 Chanzy
 Doshpuluur
 Igil
 Ukraine:
 Bandura
 Kobza
 Starosvitska bandura
 Torban
 Tsymbaly
 United States of America:
(see also Puerto Rico)
 Appalachian dulcimer
 Auto-harp
 Banjo
 Bazantar
 Bowed psaltery
 Chapman stick
 Clavinet
 Diddley bow
 Fiddle
 Guitalele
 Guitar (electric guitar, bass guitar)
 Guitar zither
 Harp guitar
 Hawaiian guitar
 Octofone
 Octobass
 Pedal steel guitar
 Psaltry (Bowed psaltry)
 Resophonic guitar (Dobro; Delvecchio; Triolian)
 Steel Guitar (Hawaii) (Lap steel guitar)
 Strumstick
 Taropatch (Tenor ukulele)
 Tenor violin
 Tiple (American tiple)
 Ukulele (Hawaii)
 Zither (Concert zither)
 Venezuela:
 Bandola llanera
 Bandola oriental
 Cuatro
 Cinco
 Cinco y medio
 Seis
 Vietnam:
 Đàn bầu
 Đàn day
 Đàn doan (Dan nhat; Dan tu)
 Đàn gáo
 Dan ghita (Luc huyen cam; Vong co guitar)
 Đàn nguyệt (Dan kim)
 Đàn sen
 Đàn tam
 Đàn thập lục
 Dan tinh
 Đàn tranh
 Đàn tỳ bà
 K'ni
 Luc huyen cam
 Wales:
 Crwth
 Neola
 Zambia:
 Karindula

References

See also
 List of guitars

String

yi:סטרונע אינסטרומענטן